The Bawabet Dimashq, is a family owned restaurant in Damascus, Syria, that opened in 2002. It is the largest restaurant in the world, as listed by the Guinness World Records.

The structure cost $40 million to construct and is owned by Shaker al Samman. The restaurant has a 54,000 sq-m dining area, 2,500 sq-m kitchen, can serve 6,014 people, and during peak operation, 1,800 staff are employed. The restaurant has features such as waterfalls, fountains and replicas of archaeological ruins of Syria, and six culinary themed sections for Indian, Chinese, Arab, Iranian, Middle Eastern and Syrian Cuisine. The restaurant received the title as the largest restaurant in the world by the Guinness World Records on May 29, 2008, taking the title from the Mang Gorn Luang or Royal Dragon restaurant in Bangkok, Thailand, which caters to up to 5,000 diners.

The restaurant was closed for seven years. In 2018, after the success of the Rif Dimashq offensive by the Syrian Army, the restaurant was reopened.

References 

Restaurants in Damascus
2002 establishments in Syria
Guinness World Records